Remote Control is the fourth studio album released by the Tubes. This was their first to be produced by Todd Rundgren (the other being 1985's Love Bomb). It is a concept album about a television-addicted idiot savant.

Background 
Producer Todd Rundgren suggested that the next work be a concept album. Lead singer Fee Waybill sketched out a storyline based on his favorite book, Being There by Jerzy Kosinski. "It wasn't an original concept," he admits, but "I tried to make it more contemporary." Rundgren encouraged the musical adaptation, and thrust himself into the project, as was his style: "Every song has so much of him," marveled Prairie Prince.

Packaging 
The cover of Remote Control depicts a baby watching the popular game show Hollywood Squares in a specially made "Vidi-Trainer".  The back cover is the show's game board with eight members of the Tubes each sitting in different squares.  The lower right corner square remained unoccupied with the band's name on the front; the eight members crammed into this same square for a photo that was later used for the compact disc release of this album.  (Three members of the band – Waybill, Spooner and Steen – appeared as panelists on the actual game show in the late 70s.)

Reception 
Although Rolling Stone panned the album upon its release in 1979, calling it "drearily obvious and stale", two years later the same magazine loved it, limiting its praise of the subsequent album, The Completion Backward Principle, by saying, good as it was, "topping Remote Control will be difficult."  AllMusic gives it four out of five stars. Crawdaddy called it "a pop/rock masterpiece."

Smash Hits said the album was, "clever and attractive, good songs and production, and enough energy to shrivel any heavy metal band.""

The track Prime Time made No. 34 in the UK singles chart.

Track listing
"Turn Me On" – 4:10
"T.V. is King" – 3:08 (The Tubes, Todd Rundgren)
"Prime Time" – 3:15
"I Want It All Now" – 4:27
"No Way Out" – 3:22
"Getoverture" (instrumental) – 3:23
"No Mercy" – 3:27
"Only the Strong Survive" – 3:54
"Be Mine Tonight" – 3:30
"Love's a Mystery (I Don't Understand)" – 3:27 (The Tubes, Todd Rundgren)
"Telecide" – 5:41

2013 CD reissue

In April 2013, Iconoclassic reissued Remote Control in full with bonus tracks, and an expansive booklet including comments from Fee Waybill, Michael Cotten and Bill Spooner. The reissue was mastered by Vic Anesini from the original master tapes and featured four tracks from the unreleased Suffer for Sound album.  These tracks were self-produced as the follow-up to Remote Control and the finished album was rejected by A&M which released a compilation featuring only one track from Suffer for Sound instead.

Bonus tracks:
"Dreams Come True"
"Dangerous"
"Don't Ask Me" 
"Holy War"

Personnel
Fee Waybill - vocals
Bill Spooner - guitar, vocals
Michael Cotten - synthesizer
Mingo Lewis - percussion
Prairie Prince - drums
Roger Steen - guitar, vocals
Re Styles - vocals
Vince Welnick - keyboards
Rick Anderson - bass

Additional personnel:
Todd Rundgren - producer, guitar, keyboards

Charts

References

Remote Control (album)
Remote Control (album)
Albums produced by Todd Rundgren
A&M Records albums
Concept albums